The Vancouver Playhouse is a civic theatre venue in Vancouver, British Columbia, Canada. Along with the Orpheum,  the Queen Elizabeth Theatre and the Annex, it is one of four facilities operated by the Vancouver Civic Theatres Department (the Playhouse adjoins the QE Theatre in the same complex). The venue is situated at the corner of Hamilton and Dunsmuir  and seats 668 plus 5 wheelchairs. Several local arts organizations perform regularly at the venue, including the Vancouver Recital Society, Friends of Chamber Music and DanceHouse.

References

External links
 Vancouver Civic Theatres 
 Friends of Chamber Music
 DanceHouse 

Theatres in Vancouver
1962 establishments in British Columbia